Republique or La République or variation may refer to:

Places
 République (Paris Métro), a station of the Paris Métro
 République (video game), an episodic action-adventure stealth video game
 Place de la République (disambiguation), several public squares
 Rue de la République, a street in Lyon, France

Vehicles
 French battleship République, a pre-dreadnought battleship of the French Navy built in 1902
 République-class battleship
 La République (airship)

See also 
 French ship République française (1802)
 La Nouvelle République (disambiguation)
 Republic (disambiguation)
 Republicain (disambiguation)